David Bond may refer to:

 David P. Bond (author) (1951–2020),Journalist, historian and author
 David Bond (sailor) (1922–2013), British sailor and Olympic Champion
 David Bond (journalist), British sports journalist
 David Bond (designer), British fashion designer and historian